The 69th Artillery Regiment Silvania (Regimentul 69 Artilerie) is an artillery regiment of the Romanian Land Forces. It is currently subordinated to the 4th Infantry Division and its headquarters are located in Șimleu Silvaniei.

Structure
69th Mixed Artillery Regiment "Silvania" - Șimleu Silvaniei
7th Artillery Battalion "General Vasile Danacu" - Florești-Cluj
315th Artillery Battalion "Simion Bărnuțiu" - Șimleu Silvaniei
316th Data Acquisition Battalion "Guruslău" - Șimleu Silvaniei
317th Logistic Battalion "Voievodul Gelu"- Zalău
612th Antitank Artillery Battalion "Maramureș" - Baia Mare

References

External links

   Official Site of the Romanian Land Forces

Brigades of Romania
Artillery units and formations of Romania